is a district located in Wakayama Prefecture, Japan.

As of September 1, 2008, the district has an estimated population of 43,306 and a density of 64.8 persons/km2. The total area is 667.92 km2.

Towns and villages 
Kitayama
Kozagawa
Kushimoto
Nachikatsuura
Taiji

Mergers 
On April 1, 2005 - the town of Kushimoto from Nishimuro District merged with the town of Koza, formerly from Higashimuro District, to form the new town of Kushimoto (now part of Higashimuro District).
On May 1, 2005 - the town of Hongū merged into the city of Tanabe.
On October 1, 2005 - the town of Kumanogawa merged into the city of Shingū.

Districts in Wakayama Prefecture